Lionel Robert (born 20 April 1962 in Le Mans) is a French former racing driver.

References

1962 births
Living people
French racing drivers
24 Hours of Le Mans drivers
IMSA GT Championship drivers
World Sportscar Championship drivers
Sportspeople from Le Mans

RC Formula drivers
Boutsen Ginion Racing drivers